Peter Paul Slobodian (April 24, 1918 — November 17, 1986) was a Canadian professional ice hockey player who played 41 games in the National Hockey League for the New York Americans during the 1940–41 season. The rest of his career, which lasted from 1938 to 1949, was spent in the minor leagues. He was born in Dauphin, Manitoba.

Career statistics

Regular season and playoffs

External links
 

1918 births
1986 deaths
Brandon Wheat Kings players
Canadian expatriates in the United States
Canadian ice hockey defencemen
Hershey Bears players
Ice hockey people from Manitoba
New York Americans players
Sportspeople from Dauphin, Manitoba